Charles Champion Rawlins (13 April 1846 – 10 July 1918) was a 19th-century Conservative Member of Parliament in New Zealand for just over a year.

Born in Liverpool, Lancashire, England, on 13 April 1846, Rawlins was a mining engineer. He arrived in New Zealand in 1875.

He won the Tuapeka electorate in a by-election on 2 November  after William Larnach committed suicide; and lost it in the 1899 general election, on 15 November 1899.

Rawlins died at Riverton on 10 July 1918, and was buried at Riverton Cemetery.

References

Unsuccessful candidates in the 1899 New Zealand general election
New Zealand MPs for South Island electorates
Engineers from Liverpool
English emigrants to New Zealand
19th-century New Zealand politicians
Members of the New Zealand House of Representatives